Valerie Bradford  is a Canadian politician who was elected to represent the riding of Kitchener South—Hespeler in the House of Commons of Canada in the 2021 Canadian federal election. She is a member of the Liberal Party.

Education 
Bradford received a Diploma in Travel and Tourism from Humber College before completing a certification in Economic Development from the University of Waterloo and completing the Ontario Management Development, Supervisory Studies program at Mohawk College.

Background 
Bradford began her career as a volunteer Producer and on-air personality for TV Hamilton, Cable 14. She then worked as an Imperial Service Financial Advisor and Small Business Advisor at CIBC until 2005.

Prior to her election, Bradford was an economic development professional. While serving as a Business Development Officer for the City of Kitchener from 2005 until 2020, Bradford was also the Chair of the Workforce Planning Board of Waterloo Wellington Dufferin from 2016 to 2020.

Federal Politics 
Succeeding Marwan Tabbara, who did not seek re-election, Bradford was elected in 2021 representing the riding of Kitchener South-Hespeler.

44th Parliament 
Bradford sits on the Standing Committee on Public Accounts, Standing Committee on Science and Research, and the Subcommittee on Agenda and Procedure of the Standing Committee on Science and Research.

Bradford is also the Director of the Canada-Africa Parliamentary Association as well as the member of numerous parliamentary associations and interparliamentary groups.

Bradford has emphasized disability support, affordability and the labour crisis as key areas of focus and concern for her constituency.

Notably, Bradford jointly seconded Bill C-224, the National Framework on Cancers Linked to Firefighting Act, designed to raise awareness of cancers linked to firefighting with the goal of improving access to prevention and treatment for firefighters. The Bill is currently in its report stage.

Bradford also jointly seconded motion M-44, Permanent Residency for Temporary Foreign Workers aimed at creating a comprehensive plan to expand the economic immigration stream to allow more workers of all skill levels to meet the criteria for permanent residency in Canada. With amendments, the motion was agreed to in May of 2022.

Personal Life

Family 
Bradford raised three children as a single mother. Her children are Allison, Ian, and Toronto city councillor Brad Bradford.

References

External links

Living people
21st-century Canadian women politicians
Liberal Party of Canada MPs
Members of the House of Commons of Canada from Ontario
Women members of the House of Commons of Canada
1950s births
Politicians from Kitchener, Ontario
People from Cambridge, Ontario